The surname Mockus may refer to:

People

 Antanas Mockus (b. 1952), Lithuanian-Colombian mathematician, philosopher, and politician
 Darius Juozas Mockus (b. 1965), Lithuanian businessman
 Michael X. Mockus (1873–1945), Lithuanian-American minister embroiled in prosecutions for blasphemy

See also

 Visionaries with Antanas Mockus, Colombian political party